FV Illertissen is a German association football club from the town of Illertissen, Bavaria and was established in 1921. Despite its location in Bavaria the club had never played in the league system of its home state but instead preferred to play in neighbouring Baden-Württemberg. At the end of the 2011–12 season the club however decided to switch to Bavaria.



History
Although the town of Illertissen is in Bavaria, its proximity to other towns in the neighbouring state of Baden-Württemberg has allowed it to participate in that state's competition. In 1963, it became the first Bavarian team to win the Württembergischen-Pokal (Württemberg Cup) when they defeated SV Hussenhofen.

The club has played as a lower division side for most of its history. It won promotion to the Landesliga Württemberg I (VI) in 1979 and played there until 1987. After slipping briefly into the Bezirksliga (VII), the club returned to the Landesliga, and in 2003 advanced for the first time to the Verbandsliga.

A rivalry exists with Spvgg Au, which is in the same district as Illertissen. After several years playing against each other in the Verbandsliga Württemberg (V), both teams were promoted to the Oberliga Baden-Württemberg (V) in 2008. Au had some seasons earlier become the first Bavarian side to play in Baden-Württemberg and Illertissen followed its rival. The club qualified for the Oberliga through a promotion round playoff, alongside Kehler FV.

In December 2011 the club decided to switch to the Bavarian league system from the 2012–13 season onwards. The reason for the switch was the introduction of the Regionalliga Bayern, which the club only needed to finish ninth or better in 2011–12 to qualify for. A fourth place in the Oberliga in 2011–12 allowed the club to qualify for the new Regionalliga. In the 2012–13, in the Regionalliga, the club finished in third place and, as the best placed non-reserve team in the league, qualified for the first round of the German Cup.

The club was once more the best non-reserve side in the Regionalliga Bayern in 2013–14, finishing second behind FC Bayern Munich II and once more qualifying for the first round of the German Cup. Illertissen lost after extra time to Werder Bremen in the first round but received a €140,000 starting fee and the gate receipts for the game in prizes.

Current squad

Honours
The club's honours:

League
 Regionalliga Bayern
 Runners-up: 2014

Cup
 Württemberg Cup
 Winners: 1963
 Bavarian Cup
 Winners: 2022

Recent managers
Recent managers of the club:

Recent seasons
The recent season-by-season performance of the club:

With the introduction of the Regionalligas in 1994 and the 3. Liga in 2008 as the new third tier, below the 2. Bundesliga, all leagues below dropped one tier.

Key

DFB Cup appearances
The club has qualified for the first round of the German Cup twice:

References

External links
Official website
Das deutsche Fußball-Archiv historical German domestic league tables 
FV Illertissen at Weltfussball

Football clubs in Germany
Football clubs in Bavaria
Football clubs in Baden-Württemberg
Association football clubs established in 1921
Football in Swabia (Bavaria)
1921 establishments in Germany
Neu-Ulm (district)